The Goias gecko (Coleodactylus brachystoma) is a species of lizard in the family Sphaerodactylidae. The species is endemic to Brazil.

Geographic range
C. brachystoma is found in the Brazilian states of Goiás, Mato Grosso, and Piauí.

Reproduction
C. brachystoma is oviparous.

References

Further reading
Albuquerque Brandão, Reuber; Motta, Paulo Cesar (2005). "Circumstantial evidences for mimicry of scorpions by the neotropical gecko Coleodactylus brachystoma (Squamata, Gekkonidae) in the Cerrados of central Brazil". Phyllomedusa 4 (2): 139–145.
Amaral A (1935). "Estudos sobre lacertilios Neotropicos. III. Um novo genero e duas novas especies de geckonideos e uma nova raça de amphisbenideo, procedentes do Brasil central ". Memórias do Instituto Butantan 9: 251–256. (Homonota brachystoma, new species, p. 254). (in Portuguese).

Coleodactylus
Reptiles described in 1935